Squirrel fishing is the sporting practice of "catching" squirrels and attempting to lift them into the air using a nut (preferably a peanut) tied to a string or fishing line, and optionally some kind of fishing pole.

There has been some debate over where modern squirrel fishing originated. The practice was popularized either by Nikolas Gloy and Yasuhiro Endo at the Division of Engineering and Applied Sciences at Harvard University, and by the Berkeley Squirrel Fisher's Club (BSF), an official student group at the University of California, Berkeley, that has been featured in the campus newspaper. , Ohio State University also had a squirrel fishing club. Michigan State University was late to join in 2015.

Squirrel fishing occurred at least as early as 1889 in the United States.

References

External links 
 Video of child squirrel fishing
 Squirrel Fishing Instructions

Squirrels
Animals in sport